Arthur Keith (September 30, 1864, St. Louis, Missouri – February 7, 1944, Silver Spring, Maryland) was an American geologist, who spent nearly 50 years in doing field studies involving mapping and describing the geological features of the Appalachians from the Carolinas to Maine.

Biography
Arthur Keith grew up in Quincy, Massachusetts, where he attended public school until he was 12 years old. After preparatory school at Adams Academy, he matriculated in 1881 at Harvard University. He graduated there with bachelor's degree in 1885 and A.M. in 1887. He was a student of Nathaniel Shaler. In 1887 Keith started work with the Massachusetts Topographic Survey. In the summer of that year he became assistant in a field party of the United States Geological Survey (USGS) and mapped areas in mountainous eastern Tennessee. At the end of the summer he went to Washington, D.C. and became a regular member of the USGS. He was assigned to Tennessee as field assistant to Bailey Willis, who was the director of the Appalachian Division. In 1889 Keith was elected a member of the Geological Society of America. His maps published between 1891 and 1907 gave detailed description of  15,000 square miles with much intricate bedrock structure. In 1906 he became chief of the Section of Areal Geology for all of the US. In 1913 the Section of Area Geology was divided was made into Eastern and Western Areas, with Keith in charge of the Eastern Area. During WW I he began a special study, requested by the US Army, in Maine, New Hampshire, and Vermont of geological features with possible military importance. In 1924 he withdrew from administrative work to work on the complex geology of northwestern Vermont and a geological map of Maine.

Keith was elected in 1928 a member of the National Academy of Sciences. He was in 1914 president of the Geological Society of Washington, in 1927 president of the Geological Society of America, from 1928 to 1931 chair of the Division of Geology and Geography of the National Research Council, and from 1931 to 1942 treasurer of the National Academy of Sciences.

In 1922, at a symposium, sponsored by the Geological Society of America, he gave his ideas on the structure and history of mountain belts and the causes for their development.

In 1916 he married Elizabeth Mary Smith, who died in 1942. They had no children.

Selected publications

References

1864 births
1944 deaths
American geologists
Members of the United States National Academy of Sciences
United States Geological Survey personnel
Harvard University alumni
Presidents of the Geological Society of America
Scientists from St. Louis